The Modern Jazz Quartet at Music Inn Volume 2 is a live album by American jazz group the Modern Jazz Quartet featuring performances recorded at the Music Inn in Lenox, Massachusetts, in 1958, with guest artist Sonny Rollins appearing on two numbers, and released on the Atlantic label.

Reception
The Allmusic review stated "To say that this set works is an understatement. It is a highlight of the group's storied career on Atlantic".

Track listing
All compositions by John Lewis except as indicated
 "Medley: Stardust/I Can't Get Started/Lover Man" (Hoagy Carmichael, Mitchell Parish/Vernon Duke, Ira Gershwin/Jimmy Davis, Ram Ramirez, James Sherman) - 8:15 
 "Yardbird Suite" (Charlie Parker) - 5:14 
 "Midsömmer" - 7:02 
 "Festival Sketch" - 3:44 
 "Bags' Groove" (Milt Jackson) - 8:38 
 "Night in Tunisia" (Dizzy Gillespie, Frank Paparelli) - 7:03 
Recorded at The Music Inn in Lenox, Massachusetts on August 3 (tracks 1-4) and August 31 (tracks 5 & 6), 1958

Personnel
Milt Jackson - vibraphone
John Lewis - piano
Percy Heath - bass
Connie Kay - drums
Sonny Rollins - tenor saxophone (tracks 5 & 6)

References

Atlantic Records live albums
Modern Jazz Quartet live albums
1958 albums
Albums produced by Nesuhi Ertegun